Trochulus biconicus is a species of air-breathing land snail, a pulmonate gastropod mollusk in the family Hygromiidae, the hairy snails and their allies.

This species is endemic to Switzerland.

Species summary

References

 Trochulus biconicus at AnimalBase

Hygromiidae
Endemic fauna of Switzerland
Gastropods described in 1917
Taxonomy articles created by Polbot